Fusiturris pfefferi is a species of sea snail, a marine gastropod mollusk in the family Fusiturridae.

Description
The shell grows to a length of 45 mm.

The shiny shell has a fusiform shape and resembles Tomellana hupferi (Strebel, 1912).The color of the shell is a bright brown. The protoconch consists of 1½ whorls. The 11 whorls increase downwards evenly in width.

Distribution
This species occurs in the equatorial zone of the Atlantic Ocean off Gabon.

References

 Strebel, Hermann, Bemerkungen zu den Clavatula-Gruppen Perrona und Tomella / von Hermann Strebel; Hamburg :Kommissionsverlag von L. Gräfe & Sillem,1912
 Bernard, P.A. (Ed.) (1984). Coquillages du Gabon [Shells of Gabon]. Pierre A. Bernard: Libreville, Gabon. 140, 75 plates pp.
 Nolf F. (2015). The genus Tomellana (Mollusca: Gastropoda: Clavatulidae) in West Africa: a comprehensive Survey and establishment of Fusiturris kribiensis Bozzetti, 2015 as a junior synonym. Neptunea. 13(4): 17–37

Endemic fauna of Gabon
pfefferi
Gastropods described in 1912